Arhopala normani  is a species of butterfly belonging to the lycaenid family. It is found in  Southeast Asia (Peninsular Malaya, Sumatra).

References

External links
"Arhopala Boisduval, 1832" at Markku Savela's Lepidoptera and Some Other Life Forms

Arhopala
Butterflies described in 1972
Taxa named by John Nevill Eliot
Butterflies of Asia